Luisma may refer to:

 Luis Manuel Seijas (born 1986), Venezuelan footballer
 Luisma (footballer, born 1989), Spanish footballer

 Luisma, a genus of ferns in Polypodiaceae family